Jeannine Garside (born April 14, 1978) is a Canadian former professional boxer who competed from 2004 to 2010. She was a two-weight world champion, having held the WIBA super bantamweight title from 2005 to 2006; the WIBA featherweight title twice between 2006 and 2010; and the unified WBC and WBO female featherweight titles in 2010.

Amateur career
Garside began boxing as an amateur in Duncan, British Columbia, Canada after seeing Christy Martin fight Deirdre Gogarty on a Mike Tyson undercard in March 1996. Jeannine was the British Columbia champion in 1998 and 1999 and was named British Columbia Boxer of the Year in 1998.

On January 24, 1999, in the 57 kg final of the 1999 Canadian National Championships held in Sudbury, Ontario Jeannine defeated Danielle Bouchard of Quebec by a 5-3 score to win her first national title and earn a place on the Canadian National Women's Boxing team that would soon pit her against some of the best female fighters in the world at her weight.
 
On December 4, 1999 in the 57 kg final of the 2000 Canadian National Championships at the Sportsplex in Campbell River, British Columbia, Jeannine defeated Michelle Collins of Alberta by an 11-1 score.

Jeannine tore an ACL in her knee during a touch football game in 2000 and this injury required reconstructive surgery. 
Undeterred, Jeannine returned to the ring and on January 27, 2001 in the 57 kg final of the 2001 Canadian National Championships in Cap-de-la-Madelaine, Quebec, she defeated Wendy Broad of Quebec by an 11-4 score and was voted the tournament's Best Boxer.

Jeannine began boxing at the Border City Boxing Club where Margaret Sidoroff and Josh Canty have trained her since 2001.

At the Canadian National Senior Championships in St. Catharines, Ontario in January 2002, Jeannine won her fourth straight 57 kg national title with an RSC-2 win over Angie Collins of Ontario.

On August 29, 2002 in Kansas City, Missouri Jeannine won a unanimous decision over USA Champion Jennifer Han of El Paso, Texas in the Women's 126 lb division.

On September 2, 2002 in the 126-lb final of the Ringside National Tournament in Kansas City, Missouri, Jeannine knocked out Sharon Gaines of Seattle, Washington, USA in the third round.
 
Jeannine finished her amateur boxing career with an impressive 40-5 record.

Professional career
On December 4, 2004 at the Emerald Queen Casino in Tacoma, Washington, Garside won her pro debut when she defeated Heather Percival of Fontana, California by a unanimous 40-36 margin. Percival fell to 4-1-0 (0 KO).

On August 26, 2005 at the Renaissance Worthington Hotel in Fort Worth, Texas, Garside improved to 2-0 as a pro with a four-round unanimous (39-36, 40-36, 40-36) decision over Rita Serrano of Fort Worth. Serrano survived a first round knock down in this bout, which dropped her record to 3-2 (1 KO).

On October 8, 2005 at the outdoor Amphitheater at Harrah's in Laughlin, Nevada, Garside won by a TKO at 1:25 in the fifth round over Rita Valentini. The scheduled six-round fight started out to be even, but it did not take long for Garside to dominate. Jeannine went to the body, throwing effective combinations, and steadily put more pressure on Valentini as the fight progressed. Valentini, who was on a four fight winning streak prior to the bout, fell to 6-4 (3 KO's) with the loss.

On November 18, 2005 at the Shaw Conference Centre in Edmonton, Alberta, Canada, Garside won the WIBA Super Bantamweight World title with a ten-round unanimous (99-90, 99-90, 98-91) decision over Lisa Brown.
Jeannine dropped Lisa for an eight count in the third round en route to dominating the rest of the fight with a steady barrage of solid punches. Lisa Brown, another long-time Canadian amateur star who had fought several world title ten-rounders before this bout, fell to 12-2-2 (4 KOs) with her most decisive pro loss to date. "If you didn't know, you know now," said Garside.
 
Before Garside's title fight with Brown, Garside's trainer Margaret Sideroff-Canty was quoted saying "Jeannine is aggressive, has no care about who she's in there with or what's going on. It doesn't matter if it's her mother in the ring, she's gonna whip their ass. She only knows one speed and that's kill. And she's got the heart of a lion. Jeannine's the hardest hitter of anybody her size I've ever seen"
  
On February 16, 2006 at Harrah's in North Kansas City, Missouri, Garside won a 3rd-round TKO over Kim Colbert, in a scheduled 6-round non-title bout, to raise her pro record to 5-0 with 2 KOs.

On the July 3, 2010, she won against the World Champion of WIBF, WBC and WBO Ina Menzer in Stuttgart, Germany.

In 2015, she was inducted into the International Women's Boxing Hall of Fame.

Professional boxing record

References

Notes

External links
 

1978 births
Living people
Canadian women boxers
People from Duncan, British Columbia
World boxing champions
Featherweight boxers